Paulo Victor de Menezes Melo (born 29 May 1993), commonly known as Paulinho, is a Brazilian footballer who plays for South Korean K League 2 club Chungbuk Cheongju FC as a left winger.

Career
Paulinho began his professional career at Corinthians in 2013. After loan spells at América-RN, Rio Claro and Portuguesa he signed for Ukrainian Premier League club Zorya Luhansk in January 2016.

After spending more than two years with Bulgarian club Levski Sofia, in January 2021, Paulinho joined Khor Fakkan in the United Arab Emirates for a season and a half.

Career statistics

Honours
Corinthians
Campeonato Paulista: 2013
Recopa Sudamericana: 2013

Zorya Luhansk
Ukrainian Cup: Runner-up 2015-16

References

External links

 Profile at LevskiSofia.info

1993 births
Living people
Footballers from São Paulo
Brazilian footballers
Association football forwards
Campeonato Brasileiro Série A players
Campeonato Brasileiro Série B players
UAE Pro League players
Sport Club Corinthians Paulista players
América Futebol Clube (RN) players
Rio Claro Futebol Clube players
Associação Portuguesa de Desportos players
Brazilian expatriate footballers
Expatriate footballers in Ukraine
FC Zorya Luhansk players
Khor Fakkan Sports Club players
Ukrainian Premier League players
Brazilian expatriate sportspeople in Ukraine
Expatriate footballers in Bulgaria
PFC Levski Sofia players
First Professional Football League (Bulgaria) players
Brazilian expatriate sportspeople in Bulgaria
Expatriate footballers in the United Arab Emirates
Brazilian expatriate sportspeople in the United Arab Emirates
K League 2 players
Expatriate footballers in South Korea
Brazilian expatriate sportspeople in South Korea